Frog Records is a British independent record label that specializes in remastering and reissuing jazz, blues, and jug band music. Since 2004 the company has been owned by record producer Paul Swinton. He also publishes the Frog Blues and Jazz Annual.

The Frog catalog includes the complete recordings of Bessie Smith, King Oliver, Johnny Dodds, Dixieland Jug Blowers, Thomas Morris, Memphis Jug Band, New Orleans Owls, and The Washingtonians (Duke Ellington's earliest recordings).

The label was formed in 1994 by jazz collector David French, who died in 2004, and friends who sought recordings from around the world to reissue, though mostly in the U.S. Many CDs have been remastered by audio engineers led by John R. T. Davies, Charlie Crump, and Nick Dellow.

References

British record labels
Jazz record labels
Blues record labels
Reissue record labels